Pyotr Grigoryevich Bolotnikov (8 March 1930 – 20 December 2013) was a Soviet Track and field athlete who competed mainly in long-distance running events. He was the winner of the 10,000 metres at the 1960 Summer Olympics.

Born in Zinovkino, Krasnoslobodsky District, Mordovian ASSR (now the Republic of Mordovia), Bolotnikov started athletics only at age twenty, when he joined the Soviet Army. He trained at VSS Spartak, coached by Grigory Nikiforov.

Bolotnikov won his first national championship title in 10,000 m in 1957, when he surprisingly beat the great Vladimir Kuts in a finishing straight by 0.2 seconds. He became the double Soviet champion in 5000 m and 10,000 m from 1958 to 1962. He also won the national 10,000 m title in 1964 and national cross country title in 1958. In 1959 he became the Honoured Master of Sports of the USSR.

Bolotnikov participated already at the 1956 Summer Olympics, but without any success. At the Rome Olympics in 1960, Bolotnikov controlled the 10,000 m race from the start to end, beating the main favourites Hans Grodotzki from East Germany and Murray Halberg from New Zealand by five seconds. On 5 October that year, in Kiev, Bolotnikov lowered the 10,000 metres world record by almost twelve seconds to 28:18.8.

Just two weeks before the 1962 European Championships in Belgrade, on 11 August 1962 in Moscow, Bolotnikov lowered his own 10,000 m world record by 0.6 seconds to 28:18.2, thus becoming the main favourite at long distances at the Championships. He easily won the 10,000 m run, but was surprisingly beaten to third in 5,000 m.

After the unsuccessful 1964 Summer Olympics, Bolotnikov decided to retire from athletics in 1965. He received the Order of Lenin in 1960.

Bolotnikov died on 20 December 2013, at the age of 83.

References

1930 births
2013 deaths
Russian male long-distance runners
Soviet male long-distance runners
Honoured Masters of Sport of the USSR
Athletes (track and field) at the 1956 Summer Olympics
Athletes (track and field) at the 1960 Summer Olympics
Athletes (track and field) at the 1964 Summer Olympics
Olympic athletes of the Soviet Union
Olympic gold medalists for the Soviet Union
Spartak athletes
World record setters in athletics (track and field)
European Athletics Championships medalists
Medalists at the 1960 Summer Olympics
Olympic gold medalists in athletics (track and field)
Burials in Troyekurovskoye Cemetery
Russian State University of Physical Education, Sport, Youth and Tourism alumni
Sportspeople from Mordovia